Robert Lee Grim (born May 8, 1945) is an American former professional football player who was a wide receiver in the National Football League (NFL) from 1967–1977.

High school and college career
He played high school football at Red Bluff High School and college football at Oregon State University.  In 1964, as a sophomore, he started at left end for the Beavers, helping to lead the team to the 1965 Rose Bowl.  The 1965 Rose Bowl remains Oregon State's last Rose Bowl appearance.

NFL career
After the 1966-67 NFL football season, the Minnesota Vikings traded Fran Tarkenton for four draft picks in the 1967 NFL Draft.  The Vikings used one of the four, a second round draft pick, to acquire Grim.  He played with them for five seasons, helping them to the 1969 NFL championship and a Super Bowl IV appearance. He was traded along with Norm Snead, Vince Clements, a first rounder in 1972 (24th overall–Larry Jacobson) and a second rounder in 1973 (40th overall–Brad Van Pelt) from the Vikings to the Giants for Fran Tarkenton on January 27, 1972. He played with the Giants for three seasons and the Chicago Bears for a season.  Grim ended his career, playing with Fran Tarkenton and the Vikings for his final two seasons, helping the team to the 1976 NFC championship and a Super Bowl XI appearance.  Grim ended his career having played in 133 total games.

Post Playing Career
After retiring from the NFL, Grim became a broadcaster. He spent close to two decades as a color commentator on the radio broadcasts of his alma mater, Oregon State, where he worked alongside longtime OSU radio voices Darrell Aune and Mike Parker. Grim retired from the position after the Beavers' 2003 season, and was replaced by former offensive lineman Jim Wilson.

References

1945 births
Living people
Players of American football from Oakland, California
American football wide receivers
Oregon State Beavers football players
Minnesota Vikings players
New York Giants players
Chicago Bears players
National Conference Pro Bowl players